is the capital city of Okinawa Prefecture, the southernmost prefecture of Japan. As of 1 June 2019, the city has an estimated population of 317,405 and a population density of 7,939 persons per km2 (20,562 persons per sq. mi.). The total area is 

Naha is located on the East China Sea coast of the southern part of Okinawa Island, the largest of Okinawa Prefecture. The modern city was officially founded on May 20, 1921. Before that, Naha had been for centuries one of the most important and populous sites in Okinawa.

Naha is the political, economic and education center of Okinawa Prefecture. In the medieval and early modern periods, it was the commercial center of the Ryukyu Kingdom.

Geography

City center 
Central Naha consists of the Palette Kumoji shopping mall, the Okinawa Prefecture Office, Naha City Hall, and many banks and corporations, located at the west end of Kokusai-dōri, the city's main street.  boasts a 1.6 kilometer (1 mile) long stretch of stores, restaurants and bars. Kokusai-dōri ends at the main bus terminal in Okinawa and is served by several stations along the Okinawa Urban Monorail, the only train system in the prefecture.

Spurring off from Kokusai-dōri is the covered Heiwa-dōri Shopping Arcade and Makishi Public Market, a massive shōtengai filled with fresh fish, meat, and produce stands, restaurants, tourist goods shops, and liquor shops.

Northeast of Kokusai-dōri is a relatively new commercial district called . The area, formerly United States military housing, was released to Okinawa in 1987, but major development only began in the mid-1990s. Omoromachi Station is attached directly to an upscale shopping mall; another mall, Naha Main Place, a few hundred meters (yards) down the street, contains many upscale Western-brand fashion boutiques, with restaurants and other shops. Frequented by young people, the area boasts large stores such as Toys R Us and Best Denki (an electronics store), a co-op market, many restaurants and a movie theater.

The Okinawa Prefectural Museum, containing sections devoted to the art, history, and natural history of the Ryukyus, opened in the area in November 2007 and sits in front of Shintoshin Park.

History 

(Naba is a Western Japanese and Ryukyuan word for "mushroom.") Gradually, the stone wore away and became buried, and the name's pronunciation and its kanji gradually changed.

In Naha, some archeological relics of the Stone Age were found. From a Jōmon period kaizuka (shell mound), ancient Chinese coins were found. Pottery found by archaeologists indicates that the area was an active site of trade with the Japanese archipelago and Korean peninsula at least as early as the 11th century. Though it is not known just when the area first became organized as a functioning port city, it was active as such by the time of the unification of the Ryūkyū Kingdom in the early 15th century.

Though today Naha has grown to incorporate the former royal capital city of Shuri, center of Chinese learning Kumemura, and other towns and villages, in the period of the Ryūkyū Kingdom, it was a smaller city, prominent as a major port, but not as a political center.

Medieval Naha was on a tiny island called Ukishima, connected to the mainland of Okinawa Island by a narrow causeway called  which led on to Shuri. A pair of forts (Mie gusuku and Yarazamori gusuku) built atop embankments extending out across the entrance to the harbor defended the port, and a small island within the harbor held a warehouse, used for storing trade goods.

, on the mainland of Okinawa Island to the northeast of Ukishima, served as the chief port for trade within the Ryūkyū Islands. The administrators of Tomari were also responsible for collecting and managing the tribute paid to the kingdom by the Amami Islands, whose tribute ships made port here.

 ran across Ukishima from southeast to northwest, forming the center of the walled community of Kumemura, the center of classical Chinese learning in Ryūkyū for centuries. Kumemura is traditionally believed to have been founded by 36 Min families sent to Ryūkyū by the Ming Chinese Imperial Court and to be inhabited primarily or solely by descendants of those settlers; historian Uezato Takashi points out, however, that due to Naha's prominence in international maritime trade networks, it is quite likely that many other Chinese, chiefly from Fujian and other maritime trading areas along the southern Chinese coast, would have settled here as well.

Major sites in the community included the Tensonbyō Taoist temple near the northern end of Kume-Ōdōri and two shrines called Upper and Lower Tenpigū, dedicated to the Taoist goddess of the sea Tenpi, also known as Matsu. A Confucian temple, the gift of the Kangxi Emperor, was built in Kumemura in the 1670s; the Meirindō, a school of classic Confucian Chinese learning, was established in 1718. Following their destruction in World War II, the Meirindō, Confucian temple, and Tenpigū shrines were rebuilt on the site of the Tensonbyō in northern Kume, where they stand today as the Confucian temple Shiseibyō.

On the northwest side of Ukishima lay , a community traditionally said to have been founded by Japanese settlers. It was organized around Wakasamachi-Ōdōri, an avenue which intersected with Kume-Ōdōri and ran across tidal mudflats to the east of Ukishima, connecting the community to the port of Tomari on the Okinawan mainland. A number of Japanese shrines and temples were located in Wakasamachi, including the Naminoue Shrine, the Zen temple Kōganji, and temples devoted to Ebisu and Jizō. The community had lodgings specifically set aside for traders and travelers from the Tokara Islands.

Another settlement, known as Izumizaki, lay on the mainland of Okinawa Island, just across the Kumoji River from Ukishima. Izumizaki had no notable or major port facilities and is believed to have been simply an extension of the residential community of Naha proper, which thus spread onto the mainland as the population and according demand for land grew. At some point, the tidal mudflats and Kumoji River separating Ukishima, that is, Naha, from Okinawa Island were filled in. The neighborhoods of Kume, Wakasa, and Tomari can still be found in Naha today.

Commodore Matthew C. Perry's expeditionary squadron stopped in Naha en route to Tokyo in 1853; and the American ships visited several more times. The lithographs prepared from drawings made by the expedition's official artist would be widely circulated. These images would provide the basis for 19th century impressions of the geography and people of the Ryūkyū islands.

After the replacement of the Ryūkyū Kingdom with the Ryūkyū Domain in 1872, Naha became the capital city. The Ryūkyū Domain was abolished in 1879 and the former Ryūkyū Kingdom came to an end, fully annexed by Japan as Okinawa Prefecture, with Naha remaining as the capital city. Shuri and other neighboring municipalities were absorbed into the city.

An Imperial decree in July 1899 established Naha as an open port for trading with the United States and the United Kingdom.

During the battle of Okinawa in World War II, Naha suffered extensive damage from the fighting. The entire centre of the city had to be rebuilt. On 1 September 1954, the village of Oroku was merged into the city.

On April 1, 2013, Naha became a core city, a category of cities of Japan under the Local Autonomy Law of Japan. Naha now carries out many of the functions, notably for public health care, normally delegated to the prefectural government. Naha is the first core city in Okinawa Prefecture.

Culture

Religion 
There are numerous shrines throughout the city, ranging from small huts to temples consisting of several houses. The religion is a mix of Shintoism, Buddhism and Taoism. The most visible part of the local beliefs though is by far the shisa, the Okinawan shiisaa ("lion dogs") that are considered protectors of the island and are found everywhere - walls, roofs, windows, street corners and parks.

The Cathedral of the Immaculate Heart of Mary (Kainan Church) is the episcopal see of the Roman Catholic Diocese of Naha.

Festivals 

 Naha Hari in May
 Naha Festival in October
Naha Tug-of-war

Sights 
The restored and rebuilt Shuri Castle, the former royal palace of the Ryūkyū Kingdom, is one of the finest gusuku (Okinawan castle) and among the most important historical sites in Naha. The palace, and a series of tunnels underneath it, were used as a major command post by the Imperial Japanese military during World War II, and the castle was subsequently almost destroyed in 1945 by the US Marines, Army and Navy. After the war, the University of the Ryūkyūs was constructed on the site. Today Shuri Castle has been reconstructed, including the famous Shureimon, its main gate, and is registered, along with a number of other gusuku and other Okinawan historical and sacred sites, as a UNESCO World Heritage Site.

Lake Man, covered with mangrove woods on the boundary of the city of Tomigusuku, is listed on the Ramsar list of wetlands.

Education 
Four universities are in the Naha area. Two are run by Okinawa Prefecture; two are private. The University of the Ryukyus, the sole national university in Okinawa Prefecture, was also in Naha, on the site of Shuri Castle. Before the restoration of the castle, the university moved to the town of Nishihara to the northeast of Naha.

Naha's public elementary and junior high schools are operated by the Naha City Board of Education. Naha's public high schools are operated by the Okinawa Prefectural Board of Education. Private schools include the Okinawa Actors' School.

Martial arts 
Naha-te, (Naha-hand), called Nawate by Gichin Funakoshi, is a type of martial art developed in Naha. The successor styles to Naha-te include Gōjū-ryū, Uechi-ryū, Ryūei-ryū, and Tōon-ryū.

Climate 
Naha has a humid subtropical climate (Köppen climate classification Cfa)—bordering on tropical rainforest climate (Köppen climate classification Af)—with hot summers and mild winters. Precipitation is abundant throughout the year; September is the wettest month and December is the driest. Naha has hot and humid summers with July and August being the city's warmest months, exceeding an average high of 31 degrees Celsius (88 °F). Naha has warm winters, with average high temperatures in the coolest months of January and February, hovering around 19-20 degrees Celsius (66 to 68 °F) and average lows around 14-15 degrees Celsius (57 to 59 °F).

Economy 
Naha is an economic center of Okinawa dominated by tourism, retail and service industries. Okinawa's largest banks, Bank of the Ryukyus, Bank of Okinawa and Okinawa Kaiho Bank, are headquartered in Naha. The Bank of Japan, Mizuho Bank, Shoko Chukin Bank and Japan Post Bank also have branches in Naha. Major international insurance companies also have call centers based in the city.

Naha Airport is a major transportation hub for the region, and Japan Transocean Air and Ryukyu Air Commuter, subsidiaries of Japan Airlines, are headquartered in Naha.

Transportation 

Naha Airport and Naha Port serve the city. Naha Airport is the hub of Okinawa Prefecture.

The Okinawa Urban Monorail, also known as the  carries passengers from Naha Airport Station to the center of Naha, Kokusai-dōri, Shintoshin, Shuri, and to the terminal at Tedako-Uranishi Station in Urasoe.

Crime and safety 

Two designated yakuza groups, the Kyokuryu-kai and the Okinawa Kyokuryu-kai, are based in Naha. The Okinawa Kyokuryu-kai is the largest yakuza group in Okinawa Prefecture, followed by the Kyokuryu-kai.

International relations

Twin towns and sister cities 
Naha is twinned with the following locations.

 Fuzhou, China since 1981
 Honolulu, United States since 1961
 Kawasaki, Kanagawa since 1996
 Nichinan, Miyazaki since 1969
 São Vicente, Brazil since 1978
 São Paulo, Brazil

Notable people 

Famous people with links to the city of Naha include:
Namie Amuro, pop singer
Cocco, singer
Gichin Funakoshi, karate practitioner
Eriko Imai, pop singer, actor and politician; member of Speed
Satoko Ishimine, pop singer
Kazuki Ganaha, football (soccer) player
Ankō Itosu, karate practitioner
Chōjun Miyagi, martial artist who founded the Gōjū-ryū school of karate
Fumi Nikaidō, actor and model
Kanryō Higaonna, martial artist
Morio Higaonna, karate practitioner
Sōkon Matsumura, karate practitioner
Yui Aragaki, singer, actor, model
Orange Range, alternative rock band. All members are from Okinawa
Dave Roberts (outfielder), major league baseball player and manager
Mitsutoshi Shimabukuro, manga artist and author of Toriko
Norihiro Yagi, manga artist and author of Claymore
Mikiko Shiroma, politician, mayor of Naha 2014 – 2022
Kurara Chibana, model and beauty queen, Miss Japan 2006 and first runner-up to Miss Universe 2006

Naha in popular media 
 Naha City was prominently featured in the plot of the 1986 film The Karate Kid Part II. However, the film was actually shot in Hawaii.
 The opening scene of David Mitchell's 1999 novel Ghostwritten is set in Naha.
 The name Naha was used in Microsoft's 2003 space simulation game Freelancer. The Gas Miner "Naha" is a station owned by the Gas Miners Guild (GMG) in the Sigma-13 system.
 Shuri Castle during the American invasion was recreated in Call of Duty: World at War (2008) during the final stages of the game. The player must help capture the castle and it is the final level for the American portion of the story.
 Portions of Naha have been faithfully recreated in 3D for Sega Ryu ga Gotoku 3, or Yakuza 3 in its North American localization, in a 2009 video game on PlayStation 3. This virtual version includes Kokusai-dōri, the covered Heiwa-dōri Shopping Arcade, Makishi Public Market and the Monorail's Prefectural Office Station. It also features many of the district's real-life eateries and businesses as tie-ins.
 The 2014 American television series The Yokai King, starring Shin Koyamada was filmed in Naha, Okinawa in late 2013.
 Anthony Bourdain: Parts Unknown visits Okinawa in season 6, episode 3, to sample the unique Okinawan chanpurū cuisine and learn about the history of Karate.
 PBS series Family Ingredients filmed two episodes in Naha and Okinawa at Shuri Castle and Makishi Market in 2016.
 Karate Kid spin-off Cobra Kai, filmed Season 3, Episodes 4 & 5, "The Right Path" & "Miyagi-Do", in Naha and on Okinawa Island, filming at Naha Airport, Yanbaru National Park, and the Mutabaru Observatory at the abandoned Shah Bay resort in Ogimi.

See also

2006 Naha local election
Okinawa University Junior College (1958–2000)

References 

 Ooshiro, Sally.  Irosetsuden, thesis translation of ancient Ryūkyū record compilation.  Submitted to University of Hawaii, 1964.

External links 

 Naha City official website 
 Naha City official website 
 Naha-te  - explains origin of Naha-te, the martial art from Naha
 

 
Cities in Okinawa Prefecture
Port settlements in Japan
Populated coastal places in Japan